Calesha "Bre-Z" Murray (born July 22, 1987) is an American actress and rapper, best known for her roles as Tamia "Coop" Cooper in the American drama series All American and as Freda Gatz in Empire.

Early life
Bre-Z was born in Philadelphia, Pennsylvania, and was raised in Wilmington, Delaware. Her grandmother gave her the nickname "Bre-Z" at birth when she would not stop crying until a window was shut, so they called her "breezy". She found out it wasn't her real name when she began elementary school. As a child, she had short hair and people would often mistake her for a boy. In sixth grade, she decided that she wanted to pursue music. Her mother worked in the entertainment industry, and once woke up to Wu-Tang Clan in her living room, so she knew that she would become involved in the entertainment industry from a young age. Bre-Z graduated high school in 2005. She attended Full Sail University in Winter Park, Florida. In 2008, she moved to Atlanta when her mom found a job there. Bre-Z began cutting hair at the age of 10, and comes from a family of barbers, with her grandfather, father, and mother all working as barbers. While working as a barber, she cut hair for Akon and Ludacris. In 2014, she moved to Los Angeles to pursue her dream of becoming a musician with only one dollar in her bank account.

Career
Bre-Z began her music career at age 14 with impromptu performances around Philadelphia. Her brother used to rap, and she would perform his songs until she began writing her own. When she was 15, she met Freeway of Roc-A-Fella Records rap group State Property. Freeway put her in a studio and recorded her first song with her.

Bre-Z began writing songs with Dr. Dre, Jennifer Lopez, and The Game. She moved to Los Angeles when she was 24 to pursue her music. In 2015, after landing an audition through a barbershop connection, Bre-Z was cast in the role of Freda Gatz. It was her first audition and first time acting. She appeared on the soundtrack several times throughout her time on the show, sometimes performing her own raps. In November 2018, she was the grand marshal of the Xavier University homecoming parade.

In 2018, Bre-Z was cast as Tamia "Coop" Cooper in the drama All American. She once stated that "Coop is literally Bre-Z in high school," emphasizing the similarities between her and her character. Her role has been praised as breaking barriers for the LGBTQ community.

She released an EP, The Grl in 2015 on her independent label. Her most recent album is titled Full Circle.

Personal life
In regard to her sexuality, Bre-Z has stated that she wants to keep her romantic interests private. In one interview, Bre-Z said, "I love everybody. But when it gets down to whatever is underneath my clothes, whatever is inside of my home, or in my bedroom... I feel like at some point, being in the public eye, you have to keep something for yourself. And that's just what I choose to keep for me."

Bre-Z is very spiritual. She lives in Los Angeles, California. Her favorite movie is Juice.

On March 16, 2021, Bre-Z proposed to girlfriend Chris Amore in front of friends and family.

Filmography

Discography
The Grl. (2018)
Full Circle (2020)

References

External links

Official website

1987 births
Actresses from Philadelphia
Living people
Rappers from Philadelphia
People from Wilmington, Delaware
Full Sail University alumni
21st-century American women